Georgia State Route 6 Business may refer to:

 Georgia State Route 6 Business (Dallas–Hiram): a business route of State Route 6 that exists in Dallas and Hiram
 Georgia State Route 6 Business (Powder Springs–Austell): a former business route of State Route 6 that existed in Powder Springs and Austell
 Georgia State Route 6 Business (Rockmart): a business route of State Route 6 that exists in Rockmart

006 Business